İlter Türkmen (8 November 1927 – 6 July 2022) was a Turkish diplomat and politician.

Life and career
Türkmen was the son of Behçet Türkmen (1899–1968), who between 1953 and 1957 was the director of the Turkish National Security Service (MAH).
Permanent Representative to the United Nations in Geneva in 1983, 1985, Permanent Representative of Turkey to the United Nations in New York, in 1988, he served as Ambassador to Paris and retired in 1991. Following his retirement from the United Nations Secretary-General's special representative, between 1991 and 1996 with the title of Assistant to the Palestinian Refugee Relief Organization has worked as General Commissioner for international duty. 

Türkmen was Turkey's permanent representative to the UN in New York (1975–1978 and 1985–1988) and was representative to the UN in Geneva (1983–1985). He also served as Turkey's ambassador to France, Greece and the USSR. Türkmen served from 1979 to 1980 as the UN Secretary-General's special representative in Thailand, dealing with humanitarian issues. From 1980 to 1983 Türkmen was the Foreign Minister of Turkey. Türkmen had been UNRWA Commissioner-General from 1991 to 1996.

Türkmen died in Istanbul on 6 July 2022, at the age of 94.

See also
 List of Directors and Commissioners-General of the United Nations Relief and Works Agency for Palestine Refugees in the Near East

Sources
 Who is Who database – Biography of İlter Türkmen

References

1927 births
2022 deaths
Ministers of Foreign Affairs of Turkey
Diplomats from Istanbul
Permanent Representatives of Turkey to the United Nations
Special Representatives of the Secretary-General of the United Nations
Ambassadors of Turkey to France
Ambassadors of Turkey to Greece
Ambassadors of Turkey to the Soviet Union
UNRWA officials
Turkish columnists
Galatasaray High School alumni
Ankara University alumni
Academic staff of Galatasaray University
Members of the 44th government of Turkey
Turkish officials of the United Nations
Turkish expatriates in the United States
Turkish expatriates in Switzerland
Burials at Zincirlikuyu Cemetery